Hoseyn-e Zaeri (also Romanized as Ḩoseyn-e Zā’erī, Ḩoseyn Zā’erī, and Hosein Za’eri; also known as Hasan Zīri and Ḩosfyn Zā’erī) is a village in Cheghapur Rural District, Kaki District, Dashti County, Bushehr Province, Iran. At the 2006 census, its population was 420, in 72 families.

References 

Populated places in Dashti County